Lead(II) laurate is an metal-organic compound with the chemical formula .  It is classified as a metallic soap, i.e. a metal derivative of a fatty acid. Like most soaps, it does not dissolve in water.  Lead soaps have been used as stabilizers and plasticizers in PVC.

Preparation
Lead soaps are usually prepared by combining lead(II) oxide with molten fatty acid.  An idealized equation is:

In reality, lead soaps have complex formulas.

References

Laurates
Lead compounds